This page gathers the results of elections in Rhône-Alpes.

Regional elections

Last regional election

In the last regional election, which took place on March 21 and March 28, 2004, Jean-Jack Queyranne (PS) was elected president, defeating the incumbent Anne-Marie Comparini (UDF).